Holding On is an eight-part British television drama series, created by screenwriter Tony Marchant, that first broadcast on BBC2 on 8 September 1997. The series follows the life of a seemingly unconnected group of people living in London, whose lives are strangely affected by the murder of a young woman in the city. While some of the group are able to take a newfound hope from the remains of the tragic event, others including food critic Gary Rickey (Phil Daniels) simply watch on as despair begins to unravel in the light of the aftermath. Proving popular with both critics and viewers alike, the series won a Royal Television Society award for Best Drama Serial in 1998.

The series boasted a stellar cast, including David Morrissey, Lesley Manville and Ellen Thomas, as well as Ace Bhatti and Diane Parish, who were both relatively unknown at the time of the series' broadcast. The series was billed as Marchant's "first significant project for television", and its main themes as "exploring in complex detail the personal responsibility [of every individual], and how it becomes threatened in a society which has been told by Margaret Thatcher [that] it no longer exists." The series was first released on DVD on 1 August 2005. After many years of being out-of-print, the series was finally re-released by Simply Media on 9 November 2015. Following the DVD release, the series drew comparisons to American drama series The Wire, praising the similarities been the multi-layered complex storylines and character development.

Cast

Main cast
 David Morrissey as Shaun 
 Phil Daniels as Gary Rickey 
 Lesley Manville as Hilary
 Saira Todd as Claire 
 Freddie Annobil-Dodoo as Marcus 
 Sam Kelly as Bernard
 Razaaq Adoti as Chris
 Diane Parish as Janet
 Ellen Thomas as Florrie 
 Treva Etienne as Lloyd 
 Annette Badland as Brenda

Supporting cast
 Ace Bhatti as Zahid 
 Caroline Harker as Vicky 
 Sandra Voe as Annie
 Rachel Power as Helen
 Emily Hamilton as Tina
 Meera Syal as Zita
 David Calder as Werner
 Frances Shergold as Frances 
 Tim Woodward as Ken 
 Tilly Vosburgh as Gabby

Episodes

References

External links
 

1990s British drama television series
1997 British television series debuts
1997 British television series endings
BBC television dramas
1990s British television miniseries
English-language television shows
Television shows set in London